Laraquete is a Chilean town in Arauco, Arauco Province, Biobío Region. It is located at the mouth of the Laraquete River about 50 kilometers south of the Chilean city of Concepción. 

The town is known for its variation on a Chilean specialty dish, tortilla de rescoldo, that are served by the "tortilleras" with chuchitas, a local shellfish.

The name Laraquete is Mapudungun for "big chin." Laraquete has a population of 5000.

See also
 List of towns in Chile

References

External links 
https://web.archive.org/web/20080603013912/http://www.municipalidaddearauco.cl/portal/index.php?option=com_content&task=view&id=85&Itemid=140
http://www.bienvenido.cl/destinos/laraquete.php
https://web.archive.org/web/20070929084311/http://www.sernatur.cl/scripts/sitio/destino_atractivo2.php?destino=168&atractivo=169

Populated places in Arauco Province